Zhaozhou County is a county of southwestern Heilongjiang province, People's Republic of China, bordering Jilin province to the south. It is under the jurisdiction of the prefecture-level city of Daqing.

History
History of Jin says that  in the eighth year of Tianhui(during the reign of Emperor Jianwen of Jin) since the Taizu defeated the Liao Dynasty, the King Zhaoji was here. And he was built as a state with a county called Shixing. Because of its name Zhaozhou, it was called Zhaozhou.

Administrative divisions 
Zhaozhou County is divided into 6 towns and 6 townships. 
6 towns
 Zhaozhou, Yongle, Fengle, Zhaoyanggou, Xingcheng, Erjing
6 townships
 Shuangfa, Tuogu, Zhaoyang, Yongsheng, Yushu, Xinfu

Demographics 

Climate

Notes and references

External links
  Government site - 

Zhaozhou
Daqing